Whatcom Land Trust is a non-profit organization based out of Bellingham, Washington that works to preserve and protect wildlife habitat, scenic, agricultural and open space lands in Whatcom County.  The mission of Whatcom Land Trust is to preserve land for future generations and to promote land stewardship.

Whatcom Land Trust preserves lands through conservation easements, fee ownership, and partnerships with individuals, corporations, government agencies, and non-governmental conservation organizations such as Nooksack Salmon Enhancement Association and The Nature Conservancy, among others.

Since 1984, Whatcom Land Trust has helped to preserve over 10,000 acres in Whatcom County.

References

External links 
 Website home page

Land trusts in Washington (state)
Bellingham, Washington
Environmental organizations established in 1984
1984 establishments in Washington (state)